Mori (1883 – 1937) was a Greenwich Village eating establishment that featured Italian cooking. It became bankrupt during the aftermath of the Great Depression. Its building later housed the Bleecker Street Cinema.

History
The building at 144-146 Bleecker Street in New York City's Greenwich Village was originally built in 1832 as two rowhouses. Placido Mori converted 144 into the restaurant Mori in 1883 or 1884. As architecture historian Christopher Gray wrote,

The restaurant began as a small bar and eatery and expanded to fully occupy a "rambling, old-fashioned" five-story building near Sixth Avenue (Manhattan). It survived the Prohibition era and the worst years of the  Great Depression, when it was temporarily padlocked.

Mori closed in 1937, and Placido Mori filed a petition for bankruptcy in early January 1938, stating that the corporation had no assets and liabilities totaling $70,000. The building formerly occupied by Mori was sold by Caroline Bussing through A.Q. Orza, broker, in October 1943.

Mori's gravesite in Woodlawn Cemetery in the Bronx is marked with a sculpted memorial designed by Hood and sculptor Charles Keck.

References

History of Manhattan
Cultural history of New York City
Defunct restaurants in New York City
Italian-American culture in New York City
1937 disestablishments in New York (state)
1883 establishments in New York (state)
Restaurants established in 1883
Restaurants disestablished in 1937